Wu Chao (born January 19, 1992) is a Chinese weightlifter.

References

1992 births
Living people
World Weightlifting Championships medalists
Chinese male weightlifters
21st-century Chinese people